Newland is a hamlet and civil parish in the Selby district of North Yorkshire, England. According to the 2011 UK census Newland parish had a population of 202, an increase on the 2001 UK census figure of 198.

References

External links
Newland Parish Council

Villages in North Yorkshire
Civil parishes in North Yorkshire